Daniel Foley was a member of the New Mexico House of Representatives for the 57th District from 1999 to 2009. He was defeated in the 2008 primary election. He was succeeded by Dennis J. Kintigh.

Committee Membership

Advisory- Courts, Corrections & Justice Committee (Interim)
Advisory- Economic & Rural Development Committee (Interim)
Member- Interim Legislative Ethics Committee
Member- Judiciary Committee
Member- Legislative Council (Interim)
Advisory- Legislative Health & Human Services Committee (Interim)
Advisory- Mortgage Finance Authority Act Oversight Committee (Interim)
Advisory- New Mexico Finance Authority Oversight Committee (Interim)
Member- Printing & Supplies
Member- Rules & Order of Business
Member- Voters & Elections
Advisory- Welfare Reform Oversight Committee (Interim)

Past Elections

Daniel Foley first ran for the New Mexico House of Representatives seat in November 1998 he was successful. He was unopposed until 2002, Foley won that election as well. In 2008 Foley faced an election against an opponent, Dennis J. Kintigh. Foley lost the election by 585 votes.

References

External links

Official NM House Archived Bio

Living people
Republican Party members of the New Mexico House of Representatives
Year of birth missing (living people)